Lyuben Lyubenov Dilov Jr. (Bulgarian: Любен Любенов Дилов-син) (born 19 November 1964), also known as Luben Dilov Jr. and Ljuben Dilov Jr., is a Bulgarian writer, journalist, film director and politician.

Biography 

He studied journalism at Sofia University and subsequently worked as an editor of a number of publications. In the 1990s, Dilov Jr. was the ideological force behind some famous talk shows such as Slavi's Show, "Canaletto", "Hashove" and "КU-KU". He has also been active in politics, being the founder of the George's Day Movement (Bulgarian: Движение Гергьовден, Dvizhenie Gergyovden), which was for a long time aligned with the IMRO. Dilov's "Gergyovden" participated in the 2014 Bulgarian elections in a coalition with the Bulgaria Without Censorship (Bulgarian: България без цензура) political party.

His father, Lyuben Dilov, was a famous Bulgarian writer. Dilov Jr. has three children with his wife Elina, from whom he has separated.

References

External links
website

Writers from Sofia
Journalists from Sofia
Bulgarian film directors
Politicians from Sofia
1964 births
Living people
Film people from Sofia